Spencer Cyril Gray (1890, Tottenham - 1981, Fredericton) was Dean of Fredericton from 1939 to 1960.

He was educated at East London College, and then at St Chad's College, Regina and   ordained in 1914. After a curacy at St Peter's Qu'Appelle he held incumbencies in Yellow Grass, McLeod, Burton, Stanley and Woodstock before being appointed Archdeacon of Fredericton in 1939.

Notes

Archdeacons of Fredericton
Deans of Fredericton
1890 births
1981 deaths
People from Tottenham